The Men's decathlon event at the 2013 European Athletics U23 Championships was held in Tampere, Finland, at Ratina Stadium on 11 and 12 July.

Medalists

Results

Final
12 July 2013

Participation
According to an unofficial count, 28 athletes from 19 countries participated in the event.

References

Decathlon
Combined events at the European Athletics U23 Championships